The September 1276 papal election is the only papal election to be the third election held in the same year; after Pope Gregory X died, two successors died that year, requiring yet another election. The election was also the first non-conclave, since the establishment of the papal conclave after the papal election, 1268–1271.

Election of John XXI

Pope Adrian V died on August 18, 1276, at Viterbo after a pontificate of only 38 days without being consecrated. The only act of his pontificate was the suspension of the constitution Ubi periculum about the conclave.

The number of the cardinals present at Viterbo at the death of Adrian V is unclear, but, except for Simon de Brion, who acted as legate in France, at least cardinal Vicedomino de Vicedominis (and perhaps also Riccardo Annibaldi) was absent at Rome due to illness. The rest of the cardinals decided to await on his arrival.  Vicedomino joined the electors at the beginning of September, and the electors finally started to proceed. However, the gravely ill Cardinal Vicedomino died on September 6.

The remaining 10 (nine?) electors continued to proceed. They were divided into two national parties: French and Italian. Neither of them had sufficient number of votes to elect his own candidate. On advice of Giovanni Gaetano Orsini the cardinals finally elected the only neutral cardinal, Portuguese Pedro Juliani, bishop of Frascati. The contemporary chronicles do not agree on the date of his election: dates between September 8 and September 17 are given. Most probable seems to be September 15.
Due to errors in the numbering of the popes named John in the contemporary catalogs, the elect took the name John XXI, although there was no John XX. He was solemnly crowned by his grand elector Orsini on September 20.

Legend about Pope-elect Gregory XI
According to the later account created probably in the ecclesiastical circles of Piacenza and popularized by Franciscan historians, Cardinal Vicedomino de Vicedomini, bishop of Palestrina and (ostensibly) dean of the College of Cardinals, was elected pope on September 5 and took the name Gregory XI in honour of his uncle Gregory X, but he died within hours of his election, before it could be proclaimed.

This story, though repeated by some notable authors (incl. Lorenzo Cardella, Gaetano Moroni or more recently Francis Burkle-Young) has several weak points. The contemporary accounts know nothing about "pope-elect Gregory XI". His election has not been recorded by any chronicle, and also Pope John XXI in the bull in which he announced his election makes no reference to this fact. On the contrary, he explicitly calls Hadrian V his direct predecessor. Medieval necrology of the Cathedral of Piacenza recorded only: obiit Vicedominus quondam ep. Paenestrinus anno 1276 .., without any allusion to his election to the papacy. 
False or at least dubious are also other details of the story. Vicedomino ostensibly was elected under the influence of his relative, Cardinal-Bishop of Sabina Giovanni Visconti. No such cardinal existed at that time. The suburbicarian see of Sabina was occupied by Bertrand de Saint Martin, who is well attested in the curial documents until 1277. Also the statement, that Vicedomino was dean of the College (the first in the order of precedence) seems to be inaccurate – on the bulls of Gregory X which contain subscriptions of the cardinals he is always preceded by Pedro Juliani.

Together, all these facts indicate that the story about pope-elect Gregory XI is rather unlikely to be true. Perhaps this is a reminiscence of the candidature of Vicedomino in this election.

Cardinal electors

Died during sede vacante

Absentee

Notes

Bibliography

Richard Stapper, Papst Johannes XXI, Kirchengeschichtliche Studien, Münster 1898.
Konrad Eubel, Hierarchia Catholica Medii Aevi, vol. I, edition altera,  Münster 1913.

Papal elections
13th-century elections
1276
13th-century Catholicism
1276 in Europe
Viterbo Papacy